Leptomyrina is a butterfly genus in the family Lycaenidae. The species of this genus are found in the Afrotropical realm.

Species
Subgenus Leptomyrina Butler, 1898
Leptomyrina boschi Strand, 1911
Leptomyrina hirundo (Wallengren, 1857)
Leptomyrina makala Bethune-Baker, 1908
Leptomyrina phidias (Fabricius, 1793)
Leptomyrina sudanica Stempffer, 1964
Subgenus Gonatomyrina Aurivillius, 1924
Leptomyrina gorgias (Stoll, [1790])
Leptomyrina handmani Gifford, 1965
Leptomyrina henningi Dickson, 1976
Leptomyrina lara (Linnaeus, 1764)

External links

Leptomyrina at Markku Savela's Lepidoptera and Some Other Life Forms

Hypolycaenini
Lycaenidae genera
Taxa named by Arthur Gardiner Butler